Joia Jefferson Nuri is a communications strategist, executive coach, and human rights activist from the United States. 

As the CEO and founder of In The Public Eye Communications, she is a consultant and senior adviser for human rights organizations, foundations, C-Level executives and political activists. In 2012, she delivered the key note address before the Organization for Security and Cooperation in Europe (OSCE) on racism in sports.

Her career began as one of the first women to work as a technician for NBC News. She next became the first Black woman to serve as Technical Director of the CBS Evening News (Washington) and Face The Nation and Senior Producer at C-SPAN. 

Her client list includes Harry Belafonte, Georgetown University's Beeck Center, TransAfrica, the Calvert Foundation, Truly Living Well Center for Natural Urban Agriculture, the Thurgood Marshall Center for Civil Rights, and Democracy Summer. Her company, In The Public Eye Communications, has served as event strategists for two Presidential Inaugural galas (2009 and 2013), Smithsonian Institution fundraisers, embassy celebrations, annual conferences, seminars and press events.

Joia Jefferson Nuri delivered a TEDx Talk in Wilmington, Delaware on August 17, 2017, entitled A Reimagined Fourth Estate.

References

 
Living people
Year of birth missing (living people)
American human rights activists
Women human rights activists